Perfecto Records is a British trance record label, founded by Paul Oakenfold in 1989. Perfecto was also a remix team consisting of Paul Oakenfold and Steve Osborne and in its later years, Osborne was replaced by Andy Gray. Perfecto Records have provided remixes for U2, Moby, New Order, Rolling Stones, Simply Red and more.

History
Perfecto was founded by electronic music record producer and DJ Paul Oakenfold in 1989. At the time, house music and the balearic style was beginning to break into the mainstream and Oakenfold was working as an A&R man for Champion Records. The label was distributed through Warner Music through the 1990s, until Paul Oakenfold moved distribution to Mushroom UK in 1998. Following the acquisition by Warner Music of Mushroom UK, the Perfecto catalogue since 1998 transitioned to Warner Music and a couple of years later Perfecto began to operate and release independently until it became a sublabel of Armada Music in 2010.

Perfecto has released singles and albums from such artists as BT, Tilt, Robert Vadney and Carl Cox, as well as mix albums from Sandra Collins, Seb Fontaine, DJ Skribble, and Oakenfold himself. The most well-known of their artist album releases is A Lively Mind, by Oakenfold.

In 2015, Perfecto Records released an album titled Paul Oakenfold Presents 25 Years of Perfecto Records for the anniversary of Perfecto Records running with Paul Oakenfold for 25 years. After Armada, it became a sublabel of Black Hole Recordings.

References

External links
 Perfecto Records official website
 Perfecto Records discography at Discogs

British record labels
Record labels established in 1989
English electronic dance music record labels
Trance record labels